Yunior Díaz Zayas (born 28 April 1987 in Sancti Spíritus) is a Cuban track and field athlete who specialises in the decathlon and long jump. He represented Cuba at the 2008 Summer Olympics and also at the 2009 World Championships in Athletics. He won the silver medal at the 2009 Central American and Caribbean Championships in Athletics.

Career
His first success as a junior athlete came at the 2005 Pan American Junior Athletics Championships where he won the silver medal. Díaz emerged as one of a talented trio of Cuban male decathletes along with Leonel Suárez and Yordanis García. Cuban combined events coach Gabino Arzola stated in 2005 that it was his intent to see three Cubans compete in the decathlon at the 2012 Olympic Games.

He set a decathlon personal best of 8057 in his home town of Havana in March 2008, breaking the 8000-point barrier for the first time. Díaz's first appearance on the global stage came soon after at 2008 Summer Olympics, but he did not compete in his specialist event but rather as part of Cuba's 4×400 metres relay team with Yunier Pérez, William Collazo and Omar Cisneros. The team failed to progress beyond the heats stage of the competition. He won his first senior medal the following year in Havana at the 2009 Central American and Caribbean Championships in Athletics, finishing as runner-up behind compatriot Leonel Suárez but managing to score over 8000 points for the second time in his career with a final total of 8013.

Díaz was selected to represent Cuba in the decathlon at the 2009 World Championships in Athletics along with Suárez and García. He was in second place after five events (having scored 4512 points) and although he had slipped to ninth place by the end of the competition, he managed to significantly improve his personal best to 8357 points. This score gave him eleventh place on the season's decathlon rankings.

Personal bests

Competition record

References

External links
 
 
 Tilastopaja biography

1987 births
Living people
Cuban decathletes
Olympic athletes of Cuba
Athletes (track and field) at the 2008 Summer Olympics
Athletes (track and field) at the 2011 Pan American Games
Athletes (track and field) at the 2015 Pan American Games
Central American and Caribbean Games bronze medalists for Cuba
Competitors at the 2014 Central American and Caribbean Games
Central American and Caribbean Games medalists in athletics
Pan American Games competitors for Cuba
People from Sancti Spíritus